Hamadi Ayari (born 8 January 1991) is a French former professional footballer of Tunisian descent who played as a midfielder.

Career
Having joined Grenoble in 2006 Ayari was promoted to the senior team by former manager Yvon Pouliquen ahead of the 2009–10 season. He made his senior debut on 10 September 2010 in a Ligue 2 match against Istres appearing as a substitute in a 1–0 victory.

Released at the end of his contract with Grenoble, Ayari signed for Metz in September 2011, on an initial one-year deal, with the option to extend for two further years. He was released at the end of the season, when Metz were relegated to the Championnat National. Without a club, he returned to Grenoble to train. The club were now playing at the amateur level, so he had to wait until 1 October 2012 before signing a contract, due to regulations about reclassifying professional players as amateur.

After four seasons with Grenoble, Ayari signed with AS Lyon-Duchère in the Championnat National in June 2016, having been linked with various Ligue 2 sides. Lyon-Duchère rebranded as Sporting Club Lyon in June 2020.

On 22 June 2021, he agreed to join Sedan in Championnat National. On 17 December 2022, Ayari announced his retirement.

References

External links
 
 

Living people
1991 births
Sportspeople from La Tronche
Association football midfielders
French footballers
French sportspeople of Tunisian descent
Ligue 2 players
Championnat National players
Championnat National 2 players
Grenoble Foot 38 players
FC Metz players
Lyon La Duchère players
CS Sedan Ardennes players
Footballers from Auvergne-Rhône-Alpes